Living in a Box is the eponymous debut album from British pop group Living in a Box. It was released on Chrysalis Records on 27 April 1987, and features their biggest U.S. hit, the self-titled single, which reached a peak of number 17 that year.

In the UK, the album peaked at number 25, while the title track reached number 5. A second single, "Scales of Justice" went top 30. A third track, "So the Story Goes," the single version of which featured additional vocals from singer Bobby Womack (though Womack is not featured on the album version), hit number 34 in the U.K., while peaking at 81 in the U.S.  The fourth and final single taken from the disc, "Love is the Art" reached number 45. The CD version has the bonus track "Superheroes" (Darbyshire/Vere/Critchlow).

Track listing

Personnel
Living in a Box
Richard Darbyshire - vocals, guitars
Marcus Vere - keyboards, synthesizers
Anthony Critchlow - drums, percussion
Additional musicians
Paul Fox, Richard Gibbs, Rick O'Neil, Steve Piggot, Jon Van Tongren - keyboards, synthesizers
Paul Jackson Jr. - guitars
"Ready" Freddy Washington - bass
Paulinho da Costa - percussion
John Thirkell - trumpet
Paulette McWilliams, Lisa Fischer, Myrne Smith-Schilling - backing vocals
Tessa Niles, Scarlet von Wollenman, Linda Taylor - backing vocals on "Scales of Justice"

Production
Produced By Richard James Burgess
Engineers: Rob Feaster, Frank Roszak

Charts

Certifications

References

1987 debut albums
Chrysalis Records albums
Living in a Box albums
Albums produced by Richard James Burgess